Zoran Erbez (born 15 September 1971) is a Bosnian professional football manager who is the manager of First League of RS club Slavija Sarajevo and is also the head coach of the Bosnia and Herzegovina U15 national team.

He is one of the most notable managers in Slavija Sarajevo's history, winning the Bosnian Cup in the 2008–09 cup season and also finishing in 2nd place in the 2008–09 Bosnian Premier League season.

Managerial career

Slavija Sarajevo
Erbez started out his managerial career when he was named an assistant manager of Slavija Sarajevo. In April 2008, he was promoted to the position of manager of Slavija. With Slavija, he won the club's historic Bosnian Cup title in the 2008–09 season. As the club's manager, Erbez also finished as a runner-up in the 2008–09 Bosnian Premier League season. On 20 September 2009, after a loss against Borac Banja Luka, he resigned as manager after a poor start to the 2009–10 season. 

On 23 September 2011, two years after leaving Slavija, Erbez was once again named as the new manager of Slavija, but only four months later, on 1 January 2012, he left the club.

Bosnia and Herzegovina youth teams
On 29 June 2011, Erbez became the new head coach of the Bosnia and Herzegovina U15 national team where he has been holding the position ever since. He led the team in a couple of UEFA Euro U17 qualifications alongside coach Sakib Malkočević, but was unsuccessful.

He was also a caretaker manager of the Bosnia and Herzegovina U17 national team in 2018.

Return to Slavija
On 2 July 2020, it was announced that Erbez would once again become the manager of Slavija, but also staying as the under-15 national team head coach.

Honours

Manager
Slavija Sarajevo
Bosnian Cup: 2008–09
Bosnian Premier League runner up: 2008–09

References

External links
Zoran Erbez at Soccerway

1971 births
Living people
People from Kalinovik
Bosnia and Herzegovina football managers
Premier League of Bosnia and Herzegovina managers
FK Slavija Sarajevo managers